Pendi is a village in the municipality of Monidigah in the Lerik Rayon of Azerbaijan.

References

Populated places in Lerik District